Nalamkode is a village in Thrissur district in the state of Kerala, India. is Situated at Thekkumkara Gramapachayath. The main celebration is the feast of the Nalamkode Church and the Kuttikadu Kumbhakudam which is part of the Machad Mamangam. One can travel through the Machad hills and through the Kuttikadu forest to reach Vazhani Dam. The Nalamkode Pond and Hill are remarkable.

Location 
It is located in Thekkumkara Panchayath.

Maps

References

Villages in Thrissur district